Belvoir is a small, unincorporated community in Fauquier County, Virginia.  It is situated between the towns of Marshall and The Plains.  It is off US Route 17, at the crossroads of the John Marshall Highway (State Route 55), Zulla Road (State Route 709), and Belvoir Road (State Route 709).  Because of the development of Marshall and The Plains, Belvoir as a hamlet has lost local relevance.  The area is usually referred to as The Plains because it shares its ZIP Code of 20189.

Unincorporated communities in Fauquier County, Virginia
Unincorporated communities in Virginia